Mathias Rehfeldt (born August 25, 1986 in Tübingen, Germany) is a German composer, music producer and organist.

Mathias Rehfeldt is a Munich-based composer, organist and crossover-artist, his music blurs the lines between classical and modern electronic music.

As an organist he has gained an international reputation for his movie score improvisations for silent films. Starting 2015 he focused on writing music for feature films 

As a composer he is currently signed by M-Music-Records

Discography

Feature films

Written Music

Awards

References

External links 

 Official Youtube-Channel of Mathias Rehfeldt

Living people
German composers
German organists
German male organists
1986 births
21st-century organists
21st-century German male musicians